Maximilian Pfisterer (born 8 July 1997) is a German ice dancer who currently competes with Lara Luft. With his former skating partner, Charise Matthaei, he is a two-time German national junior champion and competed in the final segment at two World Junior Championships (2018, 2019). They placed 11th at the 2016 Winter Youth Olympics in Hamar, Norway.

Matthaei/Pfisterer teamed up in August 2015. They were coached by René Sachtler-Lohse. Earlier in his career, Pfisterer skated with Franziska Pfisterer (his sister), Aliena Schober, Nadine Seidl, and Melina Kuffner.

Pfisterer skated with Amanda Peterson during the 2019–20 season. They trained under Stefano Caruso.

Programs

With Luft

With Peterson

With Matthaei

Competitive highlights 
CS: Challenger Series; JGP: Junior Grand Prix

With Luft

With Peterson

With Matthaei

With Kuffner

References

External links 
 
 
 

1997 births
Figure skaters at the 2016 Winter Youth Olympics
German male ice dancers
Living people
Sportspeople from Munich
20th-century German people
21st-century German people